Vostochnaya Niva is a rural locality (a selo) in Amaransky Selsoviet of Romnensky District, Amur Oblast, Russia. The population was 6 as of 2018. There are 2 streets.

Geography 
Vostochnaya Niva is located on the left bank of the Amaranka River, 39 km southeast of Romny (the district's administrative centre) by road. Amaranka is the nearest rural locality.

References 

Rural localities in Romnensky District